"No Matta What (Party All Night)" is the second single by American R&B singer Toya, from her self-titled debut album, Toya (2001). It was written by David Frank and Nathan Butler.

After the success of her previous hit "I Do!!" which peaked at number 16 on the Billboard Hot 100, Toya released only one more single, 2001's "No Matta What (Party All Night)" before being contractually released from Arista Records. The song peaked at No. 86 in the Billboard Hot 100, but it failed to enter in the Billboard Hot R&B/Hip-Hop Songs chart.

Music video 
In the music video, Toya appears in her house with her friends who tell her what she must wear. Then, they go to a party, leaving the galaxy for Earth.

Track listings 
 US 12-inch vinyl
A1. "No Matta What (Party All Night)" (Kevin Davis mix) – 3:45
A2. "No Matta What (Party All Night)" (radio mix) – 3:26
A3. "No Matta What (Party All Night)" (Track Masters remix) – 4:08
B1. "No Matta What (Party All Night)" (Kevin Davis mix instrumental) – 3:45
B2. "No Matta What (Party All Night)" (Track Masters remix instrumental) – 4:10
B3. "No Matta What (Party All Night)" (radio mix acapella) – 4:10

 Australian CD single
 "No Matta What (Party All Night)" (radio mix) – 3:27
 "No Matta What (Party All Night)" (Kevin Davis mix) – 3:46
 "No Matta What (Party All Night)" (Track Masters remix) – 4:10
 "No Matta What (Party All Night)" (Mike Rizzo remix) – 3:46
 "No Matta What (Party All Night)" (radio mix instrumental) – 3:27

Charts

Release history

References

External links 
 

2001 singles
2001 songs
Arista Records singles
Songs written by David Frank (musician)
Songs written by Nate Butler
Toya (singer) songs